Vakkaleri Narayana Rao (21 December 1921 – 13 August 2009) was an Indian defence scientist and one of the pioneers of Electronic Warfare in India. He was a former director of the Defence Electronics Research Laboratory, Hyderabad. The Government of India awarded him the fourth highest Indian civilian honour of Padma Shri in 1982.

Biography
Narayana Rao was born in December 1921 in Bangalore, in the south Indian state of Karnataka to Kamalamma and Sripati Rao, an accounts officer, as the third of their eight children. He did his early schooling at Chamrajpet and Vishweshwarpuram and completed his schooling Shimoga High School and Fort High School, Bangalore. He continued his education at the Intermediate College, Bangalore and passed the graduate degree in physics with honours in 1943 from the Central College of Bangalore, under Madras University. His master's degree in Physics was completed at Mysore University in 1945. He started his career as a trainee at the Hindustan Aeronautics Limited at the Radio department but left the job after two months to join the Indian Institute of Science (IISc) as a research assistant where he assisted Vikram Sarabhai at his research laboratory set up in Pune. Later, on receiving a scholarship, Rao moved to the UK and did training at British Broadcasting Corporation and the Marconi College of Wireless Communications in Chelmsford followed by a stint of research at the Manchester College of Technology (MCT), University of Manchester, which earned him a patent for his work there. In 1948, his thesis was selected and he received a master's degree in engineering (MSc Tech) from the University of Manchester.

On his return to India in August 1948, Rao joined the All India Radio as an Assistant Engineer at the High Power Transmitting Station (HPT), Delhi where he worked till his appointment as a lecturer at the department of electrical communication engineering in 1949. He worked there for 5 years during which time he established the Radar Laboratory at the institution. In 1954, he joined the Defence Research and Development Organization (DRDO) and was posted at the Naval Physical and Oceanographic Laboratory, formerly Indian Naval Physical Laboratory, Kochi. When the Defence Electronics Research Laboratory (DERL) was established by the DRDO in 1962, Rao was made the founder director.

Rao received the VASVIK Industrial Research Award in 1978. The Government of India awarded him the civilian honour of Padma Shri in 1982. He was married to Shakuntala and the couple had three daughters. Post superannuation from DERL, he lived in Bangalore.

He died in Bangalore on 13 August 2009, at the age of 87.

See also

 Defence Electronics Research Laboratory
 Defence Research and Development Organization

References

1921 births
2009 deaths
20th-century Indian engineers
Alumni of the University of Manchester
Defence Research and Development Organisation
Indian Institute of Science alumni
Academic staff of the Indian Institute of Science
Indian military engineers
Kannada people
Recipients of the Padma Shri in science & engineering
Scientists from Bangalore
University of Madras alumni
University of Mysore alumni
Indian expatriates in the United Kingdom